There are several rivers named Kur in Russia:
Kur River (Kursk Oblast), in the Dnieper basin
Kur River (Khabarovsk Krai), in the Amur River basin

See also
 Kura River (disambiguation)